The Workers' Educational Association (WEA), founded in 1903, is the UK's largest voluntary sector provider of adult education and one of Britain's biggest charities. The WEA is a democratic and voluntary adult education movement. It delivers learning throughout England and Scotland. There was a related but independent WEA Cymru covering Wales, though it is now known as Adult Learning Wales since a merger in 2015 with YMCA Wales Community College.

The WEA's provision is usually local to its students.  In 2015–16 there were over 8,000 courses delivered in over 1,800 community venues and 75% of WEA students travelled less than 2 miles to their class.

The WEA has throughout its history supported the development of similar educational initiatives and associations internationally. It is affiliated to the International Federation of Workers' Education Associations (IFWEA), which has consultative status to UNESCO. Archbishop William Temple was a strong proponent of workers' education.

Albert Mansbridge (10 January 1876 – 22 August 1952) and his wife Frances (née Frances Jane Pringle, 1876–1958) established An Association to promote the Higher Education of Working Men in 1903 (renamed 'Workers Educational Association' in 1905), funded by two shillings and sixpence from the housekeeping money.

WEA UK
The WEA is divided into nine regions in England, a Scottish Association and over 500 local branches. It creates and delivers about 9,000 courses each year in response to local need across England and Scotland, often in partnership with community groups and local charities. These courses provide learning opportunities for around 65,000 people per year, taught by over 2,000 professional tutors (most of whom work for the WEA part-time).

The WEA is supported by the Government through funding from the Skills Funding Agency in England, and in Scotland by the Scottish Executive and Local Authorities. It also receives fees from learners on many of its courses and is often successful in funding bids from government, lottery and other sources for educational projects in local communities around the country.

Leadership

Presidents
1908: William Temple
1924: Fred Bramley
1926: Arthur Pugh
1928: R. H. Tawney
1944: Harold Clay
1958: Asa Briggs
1968: Ellen McCullough
1971: Billy Hughes
1981: Bernard Jennings
1990s: Bill Conboy
2008: Colin Barnes
2016: Lynne Smith
2020: Pat Kynaston

General Secretaries
1905: Albert Mansbridge
1916: J. M. MacTavish
1928: John William Muir
1931: Alec Firth
1934: Ernest Green
1951: Harry Nutt
1970: Reginal James Jefferies
1982: Robert Lochrie
2003: Richard Bolsin
2012: Ruth Spellman
2020: Simon Parkinson

WEA Scotland
The first Scottish branch of the WEA was in Springburn, Glasgow, although this only lasted until 1909 at that time, the Edinburgh and Leith Branch coming into existence on 25 October 1912 after a meeting held at the Free Gardeners' Hall, 12-14 Picardy Place, Edinburgh.  The meeting was chaired by Professor Lodge and addressed by Albert Mansbridge and Dr. Bernard Bosanquet. The meeting was attended by 200 people, including James Munro who became Secretary of the newly formed branch.

WEA Northern Ireland
The Workers' Educational Association NI ceased to function in June 2014, when it ran into a cash flow problem and its bank refused to extend credit. It provided adult education in community and workplace settings. Its title was somewhat misleading as it provided education for all types of people and in particular tried to reach out to those who missed out on learning first time round.  It worked mainly with those over 18.

Some background ...

 It was set up in Belfast in 1910 and part of a wider network of WEAs, the first of which started in England in 1903.
 It operated across Northern Ireland and in the Border Counties in the Republic. It has around 6,500 learners in any given year.

Its courses were organized mainly in venues such as community halls, arts centres and training rooms in workplaces.

Wales
WEA branches for North and South Wales were established early in the 20th century. An instrumental figure was David Thomas, who taught classes for the WEA in Caernarfonshire from 1928 to 1959, and instigated the founding of Lleufer (Light) as a Welsh-language WEA periodical, which he edited it until 1965. Coleg Harlech was founded in 1925 as a residential college for workers' education, and in 2001 merged with the WEA (North Wales). Further mergers in 2014 unified North and South, then in 2015 WEA Cymru merged with YMCA Community College to form Adult Learning Wales - Addysg Oedolion Cymru.

In Australia, New Zealand and some regions of Canada 

In 1913, the University of Melbourne invited Mansbridge to visit Australia to help set up branches there. The Mansbrige family arrived on 8 July on a 17-week mission aimed at forming branches of the association in New South Wales, Queensland, Victoria, South Australia, West Australia and Tasmania and WEAs were initially set up in all states. As of 2012, the WEA in South Australia claims to be 'Australia's largest non-government adult community education organisation' and the WEAs in New South Wales and Victoria are still operating.

During this trip the Mansbridges then made a brief visit to New Zealand where WEA branches were established in 1915. Seven branches are still operating along similar lines to those in Australia. Branches Waitakere, Kapiti Coast, Wellington, Canterbury, Te Anau, Gore and Southland provides flexible learning to over 12,000 students each year. The Canterbury branch initially held its classes in a dingy rented room down a back alley; now its homed in the central city villa it purchased in 1957, where it teaches over 130 courses a year. From the 1920s, it took adult education to nearly every nook and cranny of the Canterbury and Westland provinces through a travelling library book scheme.
 
Early work was patterned on the WEAs in the UK. However, given the different demographic arrangements in Australia, and in the absence of other adult education providers, the WEAs in Australia became general adult education agencies. In the 1980s a range of other training providers started offering adult education thereby changing the role of the WEAs. The WEAs in Australia have many clubs and societies associated with their operation. A typical example is the WEA Film Study Group based in New South Wales. Reorganization in 1994 saw the WEA in New South Wales split into WEA Sydney, WEA Hunter (Newcastle) and WEA Illawarra (Wollongong).

There are also some branches in Canada which have presently and currently opened in March 2014 although however its services has been established since 1917 (98 years old) and is part of the WEA International; it operates mainly in Toronto, Ottawa, and Halifax as well as St Johns. it is currently operated under the Canadian government licences and jurisdictions of division branch companies ltd.' (LLC)

See also
 Adult education
 Community college
 Continuing education
 Lifelong learning
 Vocational education

References

Further reading

UK
Lawrence Goldman, past President of the former Thames and Solent District WEA, has written:
Dons and Workers: Oxford and Adult Education Since 1850 (Oxford: Clarendon Press, 1995)
'Intellectuals and the English Working Class 1870-1945: The Case of Adult Education', History of Education 29:4 (1999), 281-300 
'Education as Politics: University Adult Education in England since 1870', Oxford Review of Education 25:1-2 (1999), 89-101
 2003: A Century of Learning 1903 - 2003 Timeline. Workers' Educational Association Scotland. © WEA Scotland. 

Joe England (ed.), 2007 'Changing Lives: Workers' Education in Wales 1907-2007'

Australia

External links 

 Official website

 
Australian vocational education and training providers
Educational organisations based in the United Kingdom